Ejin or Ejina (Mongolian:   Эжэн-э қосиу Ejen-e qosiɣu) is a banner in the far west of Inner Mongolia, China. It is under the administration of Alxa League and is the westernmost county-level division of Inner Mongolia, bordering Gansu province to the west and Mongolia's Bayankhongor and Govi-Altai Provinces. Its seat is located at Dalaihob Town. To the west, it shares a border with Subei Mongol Autonomous County of Jiuquan, Gansu.

History
The area was historically the hunting grounds of the Xiongnu, before being acquired by Han Dynasty in BC 121. The ruins of the ancient city of Khara-Khoto, founded by the Western Xia, are located in Ejin.

Ejin was incorporated into the Mongol Empire under Genghis Khan in 1226. During the Yuan Dynasty, the area was home to nomadic Mongol populations. It was later incorporated into the Qing Dynasty (1644–1912).  Under the Republic of China, the area was under the jurisdiction of Ningxia province. The area fell under the control of the Communist Party in September 1949. Subsequently, it was placed successively under government commissions in Jiuquan, Zhangye, and Ningxia province.

On June 1, 1956, Ejin became part of the Bayannur League of the Inner Mongolia Autonomous Region. The Jiuquan Satellite Launch Center was constructed at around the same time. On May 1, 1980, it became part of the Alxa League. Since the Chinese economic reforms in the 1980s, Ejin rapidly developed its economy. By the early 21st century it became one of the fastest-growing counties in the country measured by GDP.

Geography
Ejin Banner is the westernmost banner of Inner Mongolia. It is located in the Gobi Desert and borders Mongolia in the north, Gansu Province in the southwest, and Alxa Right Banner in the southeast.

Ejin Banner is geographically vast — approximately the size of South Korea, it covers an area larger than each of the provinces of Jiangsu and Zhejiang.

Ejin Banner takes its name from the Ejin River, also known as the Ruo Shui, which flows from the Qilian Mountains of Gansu, and whose two distributaries terminate in Juyan Lake Basin within Ejin Banner. Most of the banner's population resides in this river's valley.

Climate

Transportation
Ejin Banner is served by the Ejin Banner Taolai Airport.

Train transportation is provided by Jiayuguan–Ceke and the Linhe–Ceke railways, which are primarily used to haul coal that has been trucked from Nariin Sukhait mining complex in Mongolia to Ceke and is loaded on trains at the coal terminals there. Passenger service exists on this railway; as of 2015 there is daily passenger service between Ejin and the regional capital Hohhot, which takes approximately 16 hours.

There is also a railway south to both sites (northern and southern) of Jiuquan Satellite Launch Center, which are also located within Ejin Banner.

See also
 Khara-Khoto
 Jiuquan Satellite Launch Center
 Juyan Lake Basin

References

External links
 Ejin Banner Government Website 

Banners of Inner Mongolia
Alxa League